Sieger is a German surname.

People with the surname include:
 Dieter Sieger (*1938), German architect, shipbuilder, industrial designer, painter and art collector
 Nadja Sieger (*1967), Swiss comedian

See also
Names sometimes confused:
 Pete Seeger an American folk singer
 Allan Savory a Rhodesian ecologist